Charles Hoffman may refer to:
Charles Hoffman (screenwriter) (1911–1972), film and TV writer
Charles Hoffman (politician) (born 1960), Republican member of the South Dakota House of Representatives
Charles E. Hoffman (born 1949), chief executive
Charles F. Hoffman (1878–1930), the pseudonym used by Ernest A. Janson, double Medal of Honor recipient during WWI
Charles F. Hoffmann (1838–1913), German-American topographer with the Whitney Survey Party in California.
Charles S. Hoffman, geneticist and co-developer of the Smash and Grab (biology) technique with Fred Winston
Charles W. Hoffman (1829 - 1896), founding dean of Georgetown University Law Center and Law Librarian of Congress
Charles Fenno Hoffman (1806–1884), American poet
Charley Hoffman (born 1976), American golfer
Charlie Hoffman (born 1956), Democratic member of the Kentucky House of Representatives